C. theae can refer to a few different species (below).  The specific epithet  refers to tea, and many of the below are pathogens of the tea plant.


Fungi
 Calonectria theae, a synonym of Calonectria indusiata and fungal plant pathogen
 Candelospora theae, another synonym of C. indusiata
 Candida theae, a yeast found in some fermented beverages
 Capnodium theae, a fungal plant pathogen in the genus Capnodium
 Cercospora theae, a fungal plant pathogen
 Cercosporella theae, another synonym of C. indusiata
 Corticium theae, a fungal plant pathogen
 Cylindrocladium theae, another synonym of C. indusiata

Insects
 Cotesia theae, a species of braconid wasp in the genus Cotesia
 Coccotrypes theae, a species of bark beetle in the genus Coccotrypes